The Cleaner is a 2012 Peruvian drama film written and directed by Adrián Saba. The film was selected as the Peruvian entry for the Best Foreign Language Film at the 86th Academy Awards, but it was not nominated.

Cast
 Adrian du Bois as Joaquin
 Víctor Prada as Eusebio

See also
 List of submissions to the 86th Academy Awards for Best Foreign Language Film
 List of Peruvian submissions for the Academy Award for Best Foreign Language Film

References

External links
 

2012 films
2012 drama films
Peruvian drama films
2010s Peruvian films
2010s Spanish-language films
2012 directorial debut films